

The Nihon N-70 Cygnus is a 1970s Japanese single-seat powered sailplane designed and built by the College of Science and Technology at the Nihon University.

Design and development
Design of the Cygnus started in April 1970 in the Department of Mechanical Engineering, building the aircraft started in June 1970, the Cygnus flew for the first time on 16 December 1971.

The Cygnus is a cantilever low-wing monoplane with a single spar wooden wing with plywood and aircraft fabric covering, the fuselage is an oval-section semi-monocoque structure covered in plywood. It is powered by a  Fuji motor car engine with a two-bladed fixed-pitch wooden propeller. The pilot has an enclosed cockpit with a transparent one-piece canopy. The Cygnus has a forward retracting single main wheel, an auxiliary balance wheel below each wing and a non-retractable tailwheel.

Specifications

References

Notes

Bibliography

Motor gliders
1970s Japanese sport aircraft
Low-wing aircraft
Single-engined tractor aircraft
Aircraft first flown in 1971